The 5th Connecticut Regiment was raised on April 27, 1775, at Danbury, Connecticut, under the command of David Waterbury.  The Regiment was one of six formed by the Connecticut Legislature in response to the hostilities at Lexington and Concord, Massachusetts. The Fifth would see its first action during the Invasion of Canada. As was the practice during the first few years of the war, the New England troops were engaged only until year's end and the original Fifth Connecticut Regiment was disbanded on December 13, 1775.  It would not see National service during 1776, but a State Regiment, organized by Colonel Philip Burr Bradley, did serve in the New York and New Jersey campaign.  The Fifth returned to Continental duty at the beginning of 1777. The Regiment went on to fight at the Battle of Ridgefield, Battle of Germantown and the Battle of Monmouth. The Regiment was merged along with the 7th Conn. into the 2nd Conn. on January 1, 1781. The Fifth was furloughed June 15, 1783, at West Point, New York and disbanded on November 15, 1783.

References
THE CONTINENTAL ARMY, Robert K. Wright Jr., CENTER OF MILITARY HISTORY, UNITED STATES ARMY, WASHINGTON, D. C., 2006

External links
Wilton Militia part of the 5th Connecticut Regiment
Fifth Connecticut Regiment - Rev War Reenactment Unit
Bibliography of Connecticut's participation in the Continental Army compiled by the United States Army Center of Military History

Connecticut regiments of the Continental Army
Danbury, Connecticut
Military units and formations established in 1775
Military units and formations disestablished in 1783